Wiriná (Uirina) is an extinct, poorly attested, and unclassified Arawakan language. Both Kaufman (1994) and Aikhenvald (1999) leave it unclassified within Northern Arawakan.

References

Indigenous languages of the South American Northern Foothills
Arawakan languages